Unji or Undzhi is a town in north-west Tajikistan.

Unji may also refer to:
Trametes versicolor or Unji mushroom
Unji Godam, an ancient village in Azamgarh